John Howell may refer to:

Sports people
 John Howell (athlete) (born 1936), British Olympic long jumper
 John Howell (bobsleigh) (1955–2006), British Olympic bobsledder
 John Howell (cricketer) (1943–2010), New Zealand cricketer
 John Howell (defensive back) (born 1978), National Football League safety
 John Howell (halfback) (1915–1946), National Football League halfback

Other people
 John Howell (art director) (1914–1993), British film set designer
 John Howell (activist) (1933–1988), community activist in Atlanta, Georgia
 John Howell (MP for Exeter), 17th century, English MP for Exeter, 1601
 John Howell (politician) (born 1955), British Member of Parliament
 John Howell (polyartist) (1788–1863), Scottish inventor in Edinburgh
 John Howell (pioneer) (c. 1810–1874), New Zealand whaler, trader, pastoralist, and politician
 John Adams Howell (1840–1918), rear admiral of the United States Navy, served in the American Civil War and the Spanish–American War; also a noted inventor.
 John Cummings Howell (1819–1892), rear admiral of the United States Navy, served in the American Civil War
 John McDade Howell (1922–2016), American academic; chancellor of East Carolina University
 John Bruce Howell (1941–1997), American librarian and bibliographer
 John H. Howell, US Army artillery officer
 John Henry Howell (1869–1944), New Zealand technical college principal and Quaker
 John Morgan Howell (1855–1928), political figure in Cardiganshire, Wales
 John Thomas Howell (1903–1994), American botanist and taxonomist
 John White Howell (1857–1937), American electrical engineer

Other
 John Howell & Son, 19th-century British engineering company

See also
 Jack Howell (disambiguation)
 John Mead Howells (1868–1959), American architect